WMVE is a Public Radio formatted broadcast radio station licensed to Chase City, Virginia, serving the South Hill/Clarksville/Victoria.  WMVE is owned and operated by Commonwealth Public Broadcasting Corporation and simulcasts WCVE-FM.

References

External links
 WCVE Public Radio Online
 

MVE
Public radio stations in the United States
NPR member stations
Radio stations established in 2007